Ugyen Dorji (1855–1916) was a Chief Minister of Bhutan.

Ugyen Dorji may also refer to:
 Ugyen Dorji (DNT politician) (born c. 1986), Bhutanese politician and member of the Druk Nyamrup Tshogpa (DNT)
 Ugyen Dorji (DPT politician), Bhutanese politician and member of the Druk Phuensum Tshogpa (DPT)
 Ugyen Dorji (footballer), Bhutanese footballer